Obbi may refer to :

 Obbi, Mauretania, an Ancient city and former Roman bishopric, now a Catholic titular see
 OBBI, code for Bahrain International Airport 
 Mamadou Obbi Oularé (born 1996), Belgian-Guinian association football player